1000° was a German electronic dance music magazine and web portal. It was first published in August 1995. With a circulation of about 26,000 copies it quickly became the most influential techno club guide in Eastern Germany.

History
The magazine was first published in August 1995, and its print editions appeared until 2001. It began online portal functions as "Der Clubguide" in 1996, lasting until 2005.

Main contributors
The main contributors were André Quaas, Udo Israel, Mark Busse, Mario Adolphson, and Sabrina Walte.

See also
List of German magazines

References

External links 
Cover Archive
 E-Paper-Archive

1995 establishments in Germany
2005 disestablishments in Germany
Dance music magazines
Defunct magazines published in Germany
German-language magazines
Magazines established in 1995
Magazines disestablished in 2005
Online music magazines published in Germany
Magazines published in Leipzig